Freedom Park is an outdoor park and museum at the Greater Omaha Marina on the bank of the Missouri River at 2497 Freedom Park Road in the East Omaha section of Omaha, Nebraska. It displays numerous military aircraft and artillery pieces along with its two major exhibits, the World War II minesweeper  and Cold War-era training submarine .  The park closed as a result of flooding along the Missouri River in 2011, but reopened on October 7, 2015 after four years of restoration and cleanup work.

Exhibits
 

USS Towers (DDG-9) (Gig)
Douglas A-4C Skyhawk (marked with US Navy BuNo 149618)
LTV A-7D Corsair II (AF serial no. 69-6191)
Sikorsky HH-52A Seaguard (USCG 1370)

Nameplates 

 USS Huntington (CL-107)
 USS Dayton (CL-105)
 USS Thetis Bay (CVE-90)
 USS Houston (CL-81)
 USS Conger (SS-477)
 USS William T. Powell (DE-213)
 USS Spangenberg (DE-223)
 USS Sarda (SS-488)
 USS Toro (SS-422)
 USS Corsair (SS-435)

Anchors 

 USS Decatur (DD-341)
 USS Wasp (CV-18)
 USS General A. W. Brewster (AP-155)

Previously the medium landing ship  was anchored at the park, but she was moved to North Carolina in the spring of 2004.

See also
 Parks in Omaha

References

External links

 City of Omaha Parks Department Freedom Park Site

Ships on the National Register of Historic Places in Nebraska
Maritime museums in Nebraska
Parks in Omaha, Nebraska
Museums in Omaha, Nebraska
Military and war museums in Nebraska
National Register of Historic Places in Omaha, Nebraska
1944 establishments in Nebraska